Roche (also known as Dumbrell) v Governor of Cloverhill Prison, [2014] IESC 53 is a reported Irish Supreme Court case decision. The Court decided that the Bail Act of 1997 is not a code that explains all the rules about the law on bail. The Act does not replace the High Court's full and original authority. It shouldn't be taken as meaning that the crime replaces the court's authority. The Act adds new legal reasons why bail shouldn't be granted and changes the existing bail laws. For example, the Act of 1997 added a new reason to deny bail. Before that law, bail could be denied if it was thought that the defendant could escape instead of going to trial.

Background  

In November 2013, Mr Roche was arrested and charged with violent disorder. He asked for bail in the District Court. His request for bail was denied, and he was kept in custody. He was then given bail by the High Court in December 2013. This was subject to certain rules, such as living at a certain address, keeping to a curfew, checking in every day at a certain Garda station, and not having any contact with his co-accused. His bail was taken away 3 months later when he did not follow these rules. 

Mr. Roche was given bail again. These rules were not as strict, which let him go on holiday to Portugal. There was a certain period of time when these rules were eased. His bail was taken away again when he went back to Ireland earlier than expected. 

He didn't give his passport back to Kilmainham Jail. He also did not live at the address he said he would. The Garda asked for an arrest warrant. Roche told the Supreme Court that he had not broken the terms of his bail because the supposed violations happened when his bail conditions were temporarily relaxed. He brought proceedings under Article 40 of the Constitution to be released from custody. The judge held the bail conditions were breached in relation to residence, which resulted in him waiving his passport and curfew. 

Roche argued that the Bail Act 1997 was a complete code for courts when dealing with bail matters, and completely excluded any jurisdiction in the Circuit Court to revoke bail.

Holding of the High Court 
Judge Mac Eochaidh agreed that any confusion about the terms of bail should be cleared up in favour of the accused. Even though he admitted this, he didn't find anything confusing about Mr. Roche's bail conditions. During a certain time period, the bail conditions were less strict. Mr. Roche did come back sooner than planned. But when he got home, he didn't tell the police that he was there. He also didn't go back to the place where he was supposed to live. These conditions may have been broken on purpose, since Mr. Roche didn't explain why he broke them or why he didn't give any reasons for doing so. Judge Mac Eochaidh did not agree with the applicant's claim that the Bail Act of 1997 was a strict law. He found that the court had been given the power of revocation by common law, which it could use.

Holding of the Supreme Court 
The judgment of the Supreme Court was given by Charleton J.  

The court held that the Bail Act 1997 does not amount to a code providing a full statement on the law on bail. Charleton J. stated that the Act of 1997 doesn't take away the High Court's full and original authority in bail cases. It also doesn't take away the court's authority in the trial of the crime charged." The main purpose of the statute is to introduce and process the new reason for refusing bail. In some places, it also amends the common law on bail. 

He also said that it was an unnecessary addition because, under common law, the accused can ask the court of trial or the High Court for bail as many times as they want, unless there has been a change in circumstances that is relevant and proves the need for bail. He also said that the High Court has full power and can be called on by either the person being charged or the government in any bail case. The case of The People (AG) v. O'Callaghan was used to prove that courts have the power under common law to take away bail. There is no statutory basis for this power. 

The Court thought about whether the revocation of bail was a violation of the applicant's constitutional rights under Article 40. The applicant didn't say anything about why he hadn't given a reason for breaching the bail conditions. The Court looked at the case of The State (McDonagh) v. Frawley, which said that the right that a citizen can't be taken away from their freedom unless it's "according to the law" doesn't mean that a convicted person must be released on habeas corpus just because his detention is flawed or illegal. Charleton J. said that the case did not qualify for a remedy under Article 40.4.2.

The appeal was dismissed and the order of the High Court judge was applied.

External links 
Roche (also known as Dumbrell) -v- Governor of Cloverhill Prison

References 

Supreme Court of Ireland cases
2014 in case law
2014 in Irish law
Habeas corpus
Constitutional law